Kwak Kwang-seon (born March 28, 1986) is a South Korean football player for Seongnam FC.

On 18 November 2008, Kwak was as one of sixteen priority member, join the newly formed Gangwon FC.

On 11 April 2009, Kwak scored his first K-League goal of the 2009 season against Chunnam Dragons.

On 6 December 2011, Kwak was traded to Suwon Samsung Bluewings for Oh Jae-suk.

Club career statistics

References

External links
 

1986 births
Living people
South Korean footballers
Association football defenders
Gangwon FC players
Suwon Samsung Bluewings players
Gimcheon Sangmu FC players
Jeonnam Dragons players
K League 1 players
K League 2 players